The Ion Award is the largest board game design competition in the United States. It is held annually in Utah at the SaltCON board game convention.  The competition started in 2009 for unpublished game designs, with the intent to bring designers and publishers together, and to recognize excellence in game design.  The first Ion Awards had the support of national publishers including Eagle-Gryphon Games, Mayday Games, Rio Grande Games, and Out of the Box Publishing, and has continued to get national and international support.

The competition has received game design entries from all over the world.  Board game designs that have won the Ion Award or have been selected as finalists have been published every year since its inception.

Each year local and international board game publishers are selected as judges for the competition, including longtime judges Eagle-Gryphon Games, Mayday Games, Gamelyn Games and others.

The competition has two rounds of judging.  First all the entering designers submit rules, images, videos, and summaries of their unpublished game designs.  Those entries are then reviewed by judges all over the world, and finalists are selected.  The 4 finalists in each category are invited to attend the final round of judging at the SaltCON convention, where they present their game design in person to the final judges.  After the final judging, the winners are announced at the Awards Ceremony at the convention.

The Ion Award at first featured only a single Best Game winner each year, but since 2011, it has featured both a Light Game category and a Strategy Game category.

Finalists are announced about a month before the live event.  Winners are announced a few days after the final judging.

Strategy Game Category Winners

 2023 - Gempire: Zarmund's Demands - Paul Elpers
 2022 - Clima - solving the climate crisis - Carlos Flores
 2021 - Dynasty - Jason Riddell
 2020 - Oros (Pangaea) - Brandt Brinkerhoff
 2019 - Loads of Roads - Joshua, Nick, and Anthony Winegar
 2018 - American Steel - Joshua Mills and Nat Levan
 2017 - Palooka Precinct - Glen Dresser
 2016 - Scarlet Pimpernel - Brian Kelley
 2015 - Race to Innovation - Mike Holyoak
 2014 - Xenon Profiteer - T. C. Petty, III
 2013 - Nika - Josh Raab
 2012 - Karesansui (Rocks) - Joseph Kisenwether
 2011 - Pizza Theory - Greg Powers and Brian Powers

Light Game Category Winners

 2023 - Gumball World - Aaron Kempkes
 2022 - Capetalism - Chris Chan
 2021 - Steam Up: A Feast of Dim Sum - Pauline Kong and Marie Wong
 2020 - Super Truffle Pigs! - Jason Corace
 2019 - The Night Cage - Rosswell Saunders, Chris McMahon, Chris Chan
 2018 - The Deadlies (Seven Deadly Sins) - Paul Saxberg
 2017 - Bad Doctor! - Eric Magnan & Dan Germain
 2016 - Cypher - Adam Wyse
 2015 - Stalag Escape - Matthew Jensen
 2014 - Yardmaster (Payload) - Steven Aramini
 2013 - Hold Your Breath - Daniel Jenkins & Christopher Urinko
 2012 - Rigamaroles - Shane Larsen
 2011 - Snake Eyes -T. Alex Davis

Best Game Category Winners

 2010 - (Title Withheld) - Jason Fullen
 2009 - King's Vineyard - David Haslam and Sandeep Kharkar

References

Board game awards
Awards established in 2009
2009 establishments in the United States